The 10th (Nelson) Mounted Rifles, previously known as the 1st Regiment, Nelson Mounted Rifles  is a military unit based in Nelson, New Zealand. They served in the Middle Eastern theatre of World War I and first saw action during the Battle of Gallipoli. As a part of the larger New Zealand Mounted Rifles Brigade (of the ANZAC Mounted Division) they went on to serve in the Sinai and Palestine Campaign.

History
Originally formed as the 1st Regiment, Nelson Mounted Rifles on 1 October 1901 with its headquarters in Nelson from the existing volunteer squadrons:
 A Sqn (Marlborough Mounted Rifle Volunteers) at Blenheim
 B Sqn (Wakatu Mounted Rifle Volunteers) at Nelson
 C Sqn (Takaka Mounted Rifle Volunteers) at Takaka
 D Sqn (Motueka Mounted Rifle Volunteers) at Motueka

First World War
The unit was renamed the 10th (Nelson) Mounted Rifles on 17 March 1911. They were mobilised during World War I as a squadron of the Canterbury Mounted Rifles Regiment.

Between the wars
In 1917 they were renamed the 10th (Nelson and Marlborough) Mounted Rifle Regiment and in 1921 became The Nelson-Marlborough Mounted Rifles.

Second World War
The regiment began mobilisation for war in 1941 as the cavalry regiment of 11th Brigade Group, 5th Division. On 1 January 1942 it was renamed the 10th Light Armoured Fighting Vehicles Regiment (Nelson-Marlborough Mounted Rifles). On 29 March 1944, 10th Light Armoured Fighting Vehicles Regiment (Nelson-Marlborough Mounted Rifles) was absorbed into the 3rd Armoured Regiment.

Military actions
Battle of Gallipoli
Battle of Romani
Battle of Magdhaba
Battle of Rafa
First Battle of Gaza
Second Battle of Gaza
Third Battle of Gaza
Battle of Beersheba
Battle of Megiddo (1918)

Battle honours

South Africa 1900–1902
The Great War: ANZAC, Defence of ANZAC, Hill 60 (ANZAC), Sari Bair, Gallipoli 1915, Rumani, Magdhaba Rafah, Egypt 1915-17, Jordan (Amman), Palestine 1917-18.

Alliances
 – King Edward's Horse
 – 10th Royal Hussars (Prince of Wales's Own)

See also
Nelson Battalion of Militia

References

External links
Presentation of the Nelson Marlborough Mounted Rifles guidon
The Nelson Marlborough Mounted Rifles guidon
10th Nelson Squadron of the Canterbury Mounted Rifles Regiment, NZEF

Nelson, New Zealand
New Zealand in World War I
Cavalry regiments of New Zealand
Military units and formations of New Zealand in World War I
Military units and formations established in 1911
Military units and formations disestablished in 1944
History of the Nelson Region
1911 establishments in New Zealand